Hawthorne Industrial Airport  is a county-owned public-use airport located one mile (2 km) north of the central business district of Hawthorne, in Mineral County, Nevada, United States. It was formerly known as Hawthorne Municipal Airport.

Facilities and aircraft 
For the 12-month period ending November 30, 2006, the airport had 12,700 aircraft operations, an average of 34 per day: 95% general aviation, 3% air taxi and 2% military.

References

External links 
  from Nevada DOT
 

Airports in Nevada
Transportation in Mineral County, Nevada
Buildings and structures in Mineral County, Nevada